PayMe (officially known as PayMe from HSBC) is a mobile payment service from HSBC, currently available only for Hong Kong users with local phone numbers and banks. Users can pay businesses, transfer money to one another using a mobile app, linked to their credit card or (any local) bank account.

As of Nov 2022, the service had around 2.9 million active users, out of a Hong Kong population of 7.3 million, with a market share of 50%.

History 
On its launch on 8 February 2017, heavy traffic meant that some users were unable to register, leading to media dubbing the service "Play Me". Topping up was only possible from a Visa or Mastercard credit card, with a limit of HK$10,000 per month.

In April 2018, the app won the FinTech Grand Award in the official Hong Kong ICT Awards.

From June 2018, users were able to link to a local bank account, with monthly top-up limits raised to HK$30,000, or HK$50,000 with a verified residential address. At the same time, PayMe launched an online shopping payment service, in collaboration with HKTVmall.

In July 2019, PayMe introduced the support of FPS (Faster Payment System) for transfer and top-up, along with a complete redesign of the app. At the same time, PayMe lowered the top-up limit for credit cards to HK$2,000 per month.

In May 2022, PayMe was selected to be one of the eligible electronic platforms for the consumption voucher scheme.

Features 
PayMe was introduced as a standalone mobile app, offering P2P social payment. Users register via a Facebook account or Hong Kong mobile phone number and authorise access to a credit card or local bank account (not necessarily an HSBC account), from which the balance can be topped up, and a bank account to receive money.

There are no transaction fees.

When the PayMe account balance is too low to make a given transaction, the app automatically withdraws the necessary funds from the registered bank account or card.

The social networking interaction component allows users to send and request money and split bills with others, similarly to Venmo in the United States. When the user makes a transaction, the details are posted on the social timeline, and available for other users to see, subject to privacy settings.

The app encourages users to add friends, by searching for available contacts in the app. If a user makes a transaction to a non-PayMe user, a sharable payment link is created that can be distributed through social media such as WhatsApp. When the user opens the link, they can choose to collect the money by inputting their bank account, or receive it by creating a new PayMe account.

In popular culture 
PayMe is referenced in the 2021 movie "All U need is love" (總是有愛在隔離), where - at around the 30 minutes mark - the character played by Julian Cheung ask another hotel guest to pay him "Lai See" (red packet money) to join the triad, only to be asked in return if he takes PayMe instead.

See also 

 Paym
 AlipayHK
 WeChat Pay
 Octopus card

References

External links 

 

HSBC
Financial services companies established in 2017
Mobile payments
Payment service providers
Online payments